Hammatoderus ornator is a species of beetle in the family Cerambycidae. It was described by Henry Walter Bates in 1885. It is known to exist in Mexico.

References

Hammatoderus
Beetles described in 1885